Ondřej Kolář (born 17 October 1994) is a Czech professional football goalkeeper currently playing for Slavia Prague in the Czech First League.

Club career
Kolář made his league debut when on loan at Varnsdorf from Slovan Liberec, in Varnsdorf's Czech National Football League 2–1 loss at Vlašim on 4 May 2013.

Slavia Prague
His 2018 transfer to Slavia Prague, worth €1 million, made him the most expensive goalkeeper signing in Czech First League history.

On 26 July 2018, Slavia Prague announced that Kolář had signed a new contract until June 2022.

On 29 August 2020, Kolář scored a last minute penalty in a 3–0 win against Příbram.

During a Europa League game with Rangers on 18 March 2021, Kolář was stretchered off with a fractured skull after a reckless play by Kemar Roofe. The incident resulted in Roofe receiving a four-match ban by the UEFA and Kolář being forced to wear a head guard for, according to Kolář, the remainder of his career.

International career
He made his debut for Czech Republic national football team on 17 November 2019 in a Euro 2020 qualifier against Bulgaria.

Career statistics

Club

References

External links 
 
 
 Ondřej Kolář official international statistics 
 Ondřej Kolář profile on the SK Slavia Prague official website 
 
 
 

Czech footballers
Czech Republic youth international footballers
Czech Republic under-21 international footballers
Czech Republic international footballers
1994 births
Living people
Czech First League players
FC Slovan Liberec players
SK Slavia Prague players
Association football goalkeepers
Sportspeople from Liberec
FK Varnsdorf players
Czech National Football League players